Site C may refer to:

Places
 Site C dam, Peace River, British Columbia, Canada
 St. Maixent Replacement Barracks Site C, Saint-Maixent-l'École, Poitou-Charentes, France
 Battery C Site, Helena, Arkansas, USA; a U.S. Civil War site
 Eglin Air Force Base Site C, several locations on Elgin AFB, Walton County, Florida, USA
 Eglin AFB Site C-6, phased array radar station
 Nike Missile Site C, the Chicago, Illinois, USA, defense area 
 Nike Missile Site C-47, Portage, Indiana, USA
 Quirauk Mountain Site C, Washington County, Maryland., USA; a U.S. DOD radio communication outpost
 International Broadcasting Bureau Greenville Transmitting Station Site C, North Carolina, USA
 Holy Trinity Cemetery, Wrought-Iron Cross Site C, Strasburg, North Dakota, USA
 St. John's Cemetery, Wrought-Iron Cross Site C, Zeeland, North Dakota, USA
 St. Mary's Cemetery, Wrought-Iron Cross Site C, Hague, North Dakota, USA

Other uses
 Sierra Sciences Site C, a repressor binding site patented in 2004

See also

 Site (disambiguation)
 C (disambiguation)